The 1999 season was the eighth full year of competitive football in the Baltic country as an independent nation. The Estonia national football team played sixteen matches in 1999, and didn't qualify for Euro 2000 in Belgium and the Netherlands the next year.

Results

Israel vs Estonia

Norway vs Estonia

Romania vs Estonia

Azerbaijan vs Estonia

Cyprus vs Estonia

Lithuania vs Estonia

Estonia vs Czech Republic

Estonia vs Lithuania

Estonia vs Armenia

Faroe Islands vs Estonia

Estonia vs Scotland

Estonia vs Bosnia-Herzegovina

Iraq vs Estonia

United Arab Emirates vs Estonia

Turkmenistan vs Estonia

Greece vs Estonia

Notes

References
 RSSSF detailed results
 RSSSF detailed results

1999
1999 national football team results
National